The Techrules AT96 is an electric sports car made by Techrules. Unlike most electric cars, it uses a multi-fuel (jet fuel, kerosene, natural gas, biogas) aviation turbine to charge the batteries. According to Techrules, it has 1030 hp and 6372 lb-ft (8369 nm) of torque, a 0-60 mph (0–100 km/h) time of 2.5 seconds, and a top speed of 218 mph (350 km/h).

The Techrules GT96 variant uses a turbine limited to gas fuels.

References

Electric cars
AT96